Raymond Leonard "Ray" Robinson (3 September 1929 – 4 January 2018) was a South African cyclist. He competed at the 1952 and 1956 Summer Olympics. At the 1952 Olympics, he won a bronze medal in the 1,000 metres time trial and a silver in the 2,000 metres tandem.

References

External links
 

1929 births
2018 deaths
South African male cyclists
Olympic cyclists of South Africa
Cyclists at the 1952 Summer Olympics
Cyclists at the 1956 Summer Olympics
Olympic silver medalists for South Africa
Olympic bronze medalists for South Africa
Olympic medalists in cycling
Medalists at the 1952 Summer Olympics
Cyclists from Johannesburg
20th-century South African people
21st-century South African people